José Carlos Cueto y Díez de la Maza O.P. (4 November 1839 - 17 August 1908) was a Spanish prelate of the Roman Catholic church who served as Bishop of Canarias.

Biography
He was born in 1839 and ordained as a Dominican piest in 1863 as a member of the Order of Preachers. On 27 September 1891 Pope Leo XIII appointed him Bishop of Canarias, which serves three of Canary Islands (Gran Canaria, Lanzarote and Fuerteventura). In 1895 he founded the Dominican Congregation Missionaries of the Holy Family.

Death
He died in office on 17 August 1908.

See also
 Roman Catholic Diocese of Canarias
 Diocese of Tenerife (the remaining Canary Islands)

References

Spanish Roman Catholic bishops
Bishops appointed by Pope Leo XIII
1839 births
1908 deaths